The 1951 season was Wisła Krakóws 43rd year as a club. Wisła was under the name of Gwardia Kraków.

Friendlies

Ekstraklasa

Polish Cup

Squad, appearances and goals

|-
|}

Goalscorers

External links
1951 Wisła Kraków season at historiawisly.pl

Wisła Kraków seasons
Association football clubs 1951 season
Wisla